Hanken School of Economics (Swedish: Svenska handelshögskolan, also known as Hanken) is a business school in Finland with two campuses, Helsinki and Vaasa. Founded in 1909, it is the oldest business school in Finland, and one of the oldest in the Nordic countries. Its programmes are offered in both English and Swedish.

History
Hanken was established in Helsinki in 1 September 1909, making it one of the oldest business schools in northern Europe, opening a month after Stockholm School of Economics.The statutory meeting for Aktiebolaget Högre Svenska Handelsläroverket in Helsinki was held in December 1908, and only four months later the private community college under the name of Högre Svenska Handelsläroverket statutes were approved. In 1927, the school was given its current name, Svenska Handelshögskolan. The school introduced a bachelor's degree in economics in 1928, with professorships being introduced in 1934. The first doctoral dissertation took place in 1944.

Hanken's campus in Vaasa was established in 1980 aiming to develop business education in Osthrobotnia, a region with a large proportion of the Swedish-speaking population in Finland. In 2018, Hanken joined the Helsinki Graduate School of Economics. An initiative to bring together three Finnish universities – Aalto University, Hanken School of Economics, and University of Helsinki.

Rankings and Accreditations
Hanken has received the so-called Triple Crown accreditation (assessments of quality insurance by the three largest business school accreditation organizations: AACSB, AMBA, and EQUIS). Hanken was first awarded the European Quality Improvement System accreditation (EQUIS) in 2000. The Association of MBAs accreditation (AMBA) was awarded in 2008. The Association to Advance Collegiate Schools of Business accreditation (AACSB) was awarded in 2015.

Hanken is a member and signatory of The Principles for Responsible Management Education (PRME) initiative, an initiative between the United Nations (UN) and business schools.

Degrees and programmes 
The school offers university degrees in economics, marketing, management and accountancy at the bachelor's, master's, and Ph.D. Master's degrees and Ph.D. programmes are offerend in both Swedish and English languages, while the bachelor's degree programmes are in Swedish. The MSc in Economics and Business Administration programme is a two-year programme with 120 ECTS. The specialisations include Business and Management, Economics, Financial Analysis and Business Development, and Intellectual Property Law. In addition, Hanken & SSE Executive Education (A joint venture between Hanken School of Economics in Finland and Stockholm School of Economics in Sweden) offers an Executive MBA, a part-time two-year executive programme in English.  

Hanken has approximately 120 partner universities for student exchange.

Organization and administration

Governance 
As for all universities in Finland, Hanken is regulated by the Universities Act (558/2009) and the Universities Decree (770/2009). The principal governance bodies of Hanken are the University Council, the Board, the Rector, and Deans.

The University Council appoints the external members of the Board, the auditors for the School, and the Academic Council. It approves the financial statement and grants the Board and the rector a discharge from liability.

The Board is the highest decision-making body of the School and is always chaired by an external person - at present Christoph Vitzthum is Chair of the Board. The Board decides on most issues of a strategic nature, such as the activity and economic plan as well as the budget. The Board is responsible for the economy of the School, the allocation of its funds, and appointing the Rector Ingmar Björkman. The student body is represented in each decision-making body by at least one student.

Departments 
Hanken's research and teaching are organised into four departments and one centre for Languages and Business Communication. Students are represented in each Department Council by student-elected student representatives.
 Accounting and Commercial Law
 Finance and Economics
 Management and Organisation
 Marketing
 Centre for Languages and Business Communication

Library 
Hanken library is the library of Hanken School of Economics, serving staff, students and the general public. In Helsinki, the library is found in the main building of Hanken, while the book collection in Vaasa is found within the Vaasa City Library. Hanken library is a scientific library, not only open to students or staff at Hanken, but available to everyone carrying out studies or research in the field of economics and business administration.

The library services started already in 1909, when Hanken School of Economics was founded. The library's collection today is a hybrid of printed books and electronic resources, such as e-books, e-journals and databases with financial and company information. The library has a special collection on Finnish and foreign business companies history.  

Hanken library uses the open source library system Koha, and the library catalogue Hanna is part of the Finna-collaboration, through the National library of Finland.

Research

Research and knowledge centres
Hanken hosts the following research centers.
CERS – Centre for Relationship Marketing and Service Management
CCR – Centre for Corporate Responsibility
EPCE – Erling-Persson Centre for Entrepreneurship
Hanken Centre for Accounting, Finance and Governance
 – The Research and Development Institute on Gender, Organisation, Diversity, Equality and Social Sustainability in Transnational Times
HUMLOG Institute – The Humanitarian Logistics and Supply Chain Research Institute
IPR – University Centre
WCEFIR – Wallenberg Center for Financial Research

Notable alumni
Hanken has over 15,000 alumni in 70 countries.

 Lenita Airisto – Author, former Miss Finland and fashion model
 Anne Berner – Business executive, board professional, and the former Minister of Transport and Communications
 Henrik Ehrnrooth – CEO of KONE
 Jannica Fagerholm – Finnish economist and business executive
 Christian Grönroos – Relationship marketing professor named as a Legend in Marketing.
 Carl Haglund – Former Minister of Defence
 Harry Harkimo – Businessman
 Petri Kokko – Former figure skater
 Stefan Larsson – CEO of PVH Corporation
 Henrik Lax – Former member of the European Parliament
 Mikael Lilius – Former CEO of Fortum
 Elisabeth Rehn – former MP of the Swedish People's Party and the first woman as the Minister of Defence in Finland
 Heidi Schauman – Economist
 Björn Wahlroos – Professor, banker, and chairman of several boards
 Hans Wind – Businessman and famous fighter pilot in World War II
 Christoph Vitzthum – President and CEO, Fazer Group

Student union
The Student Union of Hanken School of Economics (SHS) was founded in 1909 under the name of Kamratföreningen Niord. Today the student union has some 2500 members and is the only student union to represent solely business students in Finland. The student union organises events and is responsible for student representation in the School's decision-making body. In accordance to law, all students at Hanken are automatically members of the student union.

References

External links

Official site
Hanken library
Hanken MBA homepage
Svenska Handelshögskolans Studentkår – The Student Union's portal
Hanken alumnnätverk 

Education in Helsinki
Economy of Finland
Business schools in Finland
Educational institutions established in 1909
1909 establishments in Finland
Hanken School of Economics